BlinkNow Foundation (BlinkNow) is a nonprofit organization that operates a globally recognized school and children's home in Surkhet, Nepal. Founded by Maggie Doyne when she was 19 years old, BlinkNow has been recognized as an example of "DIY philanthropy."

Programs
On its campus in Surkhet, BlinkNow's Kopila Valley School provides tuition-free education from preschool to 12th grade for more than 400 students from under-resourced backgrounds and employs more than 100 teachers and support staff. The organization's children's home provides shelter, nutrition, and support for orphans and other at-risk children. The campus also features a health clinic and women's center.

Sustainability
BlinkNow identifies sustainability as one of its core values. In 2017, the organization opened a new campus for its Kopila Valley School which it has billed as "the greenest school in Nepal." The campus features rammed earth walls that are nearly half a meter thick in addition to multiple solar power generation and rainwater collection and recycling systems. In 2019, BlinkNow was named a finalist for the Zayed Sustainability Prize in the Global High Schools category.

Notable Supporters
BlinkNow received widespread attention after its founder, Maggie Doyne, was selected as CNN Hero of the Year in 2015. In 2016, author Elizabeth Gilbert shared a video of herself singing a karaoke version of Bonnie Tyler's “Total Eclipse of the Heart” to raise money for the organization after learning Doyne was in part inspired by her memoir Eat, Pray, Love. In August 2019, the organization was featured by Harry and Meghan, the Duke and Duchess of Sussex, on their Instagram feed along with other organizations including the Earth Day Network and Children International.

References

External links
 BlinkNow homepage

Child-related organisations in Nepal
Charities based in New Jersey
Foreign charities operating in Nepal
2007 establishments in Nepal